The Tarra Rail Trail is a Rail trail from Yarram to Port Albert in South Gippsland, Victoria, Australia. Stage 1 to Alberton was opened in 2011 with further plans to extend the trail to the coast in Port Albert where it will meet up with the future extension of the Great Southern Rail Trail.

References

Tarra Trail - Overview from Tourism Victoria

See also 
Bicycle Trails in Victoria

Rail trails in Victoria (Australia)